Ram Kumar Dwivedi is a small village of Pali district, Rajasthan, India.

Villages in Pali district